Brunson Green (born November 1967) is an American film producer and president of Harbinger Pictures, a feature film production company based in Los Angeles.

Early life
Brunson grew up in Jackson, Mississippi and was a childhood friend of Tate Taylor. He attended Jackson Academy and graduated from Trinity University with a degree in economics.

Career
Green is producer of the short films Stick Up, Slappy the Clown, Auto Motives, and Chicken Party. He is the co-producer of the film Fool's Gold. Green is the producer of the films The Journeyman, Pretty Ugly People, and The Help. He is the associate producer of the film I Wannabe.

On January 24, 2012, he was nominated for an Academy Award for the movie The Help.

Personal life
Since June 2014, Green has been in a relationship with former NBA player Jason Collins.

Filmography

Film credits

Awards and nominations

References

External links

American film producers
Living people
LGBT producers
Trinity University (Texas) alumni
Businesspeople from Jackson, Mississippi
LGBT people from Mississippi
1967 births
21st-century LGBT people